Clara Gómez Caro (born 12 August 1949) is a Mexican politician from the Institutional Revolutionary Party. From 2009 to 2012 she served as Deputy of the LXI Legislature of the Mexican Congress representing Jalisco.

References

1949 births
Living people
Politicians from Jalisco
Women members of the Chamber of Deputies (Mexico)
Institutional Revolutionary Party politicians
21st-century Mexican politicians
21st-century Mexican women politicians
Deputies of the LXI Legislature of Mexico
Members of the Chamber of Deputies (Mexico) for Jalisco